Boxing at the 2018 Asian Games was held at Halls C1, C2, and C3 of Jakarta International Expo, Jakarta, Indonesia, from 24 August to 1 September 2018.

Schedule

Medalists

Men

Women

Medal table

Participating nations
A total of 194 athletes from 31 nations competed in boxing at the 2018 Asian Games:

References

External links
Boxing at the 2018 Asian Games
Official Result Book – Boxing

 
2018
2018 Asian Games events
Asian Games
2018 Asian Games